

511001–511100 

|-bgcolor=#f2f2f2
| colspan=4 align=center | 
|}

511101–511200 

|-bgcolor=#f2f2f2
| colspan=4 align=center | 
|}

511201–511300 

|-id=238
| 511238 Cuixiangqun ||  || Cui Xiangqun is a Chinese designer and constructor of large astronomical telescopes. || 
|}

511301–511400 

|-bgcolor=#f2f2f2
| colspan=4 align=center | 
|}

511401–511500 

|-bgcolor=#f2f2f2
| colspan=4 align=center | 
|}

511501–511600 

|-bgcolor=#f2f2f2
| colspan=4 align=center | 
|}

511601–511700 

|-bgcolor=#f2f2f2
| colspan=4 align=center | 
|}

511701–511800 

|-bgcolor=#f2f2f2
| colspan=4 align=center | 
|}

511801–511900 

|-bgcolor=#f2f2f2
| colspan=4 align=center | 
|}

511901–512000 

|-bgcolor=#f2f2f2
| colspan=4 align=center | 
|}

References 

511001-512000